Philippines Campaign medal include:
Anti-Dissidence Campaign medal
Luzon Anti-Dissidence Campaign medal
Mindanao Anti-Dissidence Campaign medal
Visayas Anti-Dissidence Campaign medal

See also
Orders, decorations, and medals of the Philippines

Campaign medals